The Apostolic Nunciature to Albania is an ecclesiastical office of the Catholic Church in Albania. It is a diplomatic post of the Holy See, whose representative is called the Apostolic Nuncio with the rank of an ambassador.

After a gap of several decades Pope John Paul II established the Nunciature to Albania on 7 September 1991.

Representatives of the Holy See to Albania
Apostolic delegates
Ernesto Cozzi (12 November 1920 - 23 February 1926)
Giovanni Battista della Pietra (3 March 1927 - 1934)
Ildebrando Antoniutti (19 May 1936 - August 1936)
Leone Giovanni Battista Nigris (18 August 1938 - 1947)
Apostolic Nuncios
Ivan Dias (28 October 1991 - 8 November 1996)
John Bulaitis (25 March 1997 - 26 July 2008)
Ramiro Moliner Inglés (26 July 2008 - 1 September 2016)
Charles John Brown (9 March 2017 - 28 September 2020)
Luigi Bonazzi (10 December 2020 – present)

See also
Foreign relations of the Holy See
List of diplomatic missions of the Holy See

References

Albania
 
Albania–Holy See relations